Jefferson Elementary School is a historic school building located at Pottstown, Montgomery County, Pennsylvania.  It is a large two-story, "U"-shaped, brick building in the Classical Revival style.  The original section was built in 1923.  The building was expanded in 1938-1939 and 1957.  It was decommissioned as a school in 1980.

It was added to the National Register of Historic Places in 2003.

References

School buildings on the National Register of Historic Places in Pennsylvania
Neoclassical architecture in Pennsylvania
School buildings completed in 1939
Schools in Montgomery County, Pennsylvania
National Register of Historic Places in Montgomery County, Pennsylvania